Delphyodontos dacriformes is a prehistoric holocephalid fish from the middle Carboniferous-aged Bear Gulch Limestone Lagerstätte, during the Bashkirian Stage in Montana. The adult form is unknown, as the only fossil specimens are of aborted fetuses or recently born young. Sharp teeth and fecal matter in the fossils suggests that Delphyodontos practiced intrauterine cannibalism, like some modern sharks, such as sand tiger sharks.

Appearance
According to the fossils, the recently born would have resembled tadpoles with small, but sharp beaks.  Because of the evidence suggesting intrauterine cannibalism, D. dacriformes is assumed to have been carnivorous, though, besides siblings, it is unknown what other organisms they would have eaten.

Etymology
The generic name, Delphyodontos, means "womb tooth", in reference to the sharp, beak-like teeth and their possible habits of intrauterine cannibalism. The specific name, dacriformes, refers to the teardrop-shaped body.

References

Holocephali
Prehistoric cartilaginous fish genera
Carboniferous cartilaginous fish
Pennsylvanian fish of North America
Fossil taxa described in 1980
Natural history of Montana